XHHHI-FM was a radio station on 99.3 FM in Hidalgo del Parral, Chihuahua, Mexico. It was owned by Radiorama and last carried its @FM pop format.

History
XEHHI-AM 640 received its concession on November 16, 1988. It was owned by Sistemas Populares de Comunicación, S.A. de C.V., owned by Arnoldo Rodríguez Zermeño. The concession was later transferred to Radio XEHHI-AM, S.A. de C.V., also owned by Zermeño. However, Zermeño opted to sell the station to Radiorama.

XEHHI received approval to migrate to FM in 2011. In 2015, its facilities moved to Cerro El Ángulo and the station decreased power from 25 kW to 10.
The concession expired in 2018, and XHHHI signed off for good on June 30, 2019. Sister station XHSB-FM became a dual Arroba FM/Éxtasis Digital station with XHHHI's closure.

References

Radio stations in Chihuahua
Defunct radio stations in Mexico
2019 disestablishments in Mexico
Radio stations disestablished in 2019
1988 establishments in Mexico
Radio stations established in 1988